Margaret Pomeranz  (born 14 July 1944) is an Australian film critic, writer, producer and television personality.

Early life
Pomeranz was born Margeret Anne Jones-Owen on 14 July 1944 in Waverley, a suburb of Sydney.

She was educated at the Presbyterian Ladies' College, Sydney in Croydon, the then newly-opened Macquarie University, where she graduated with a Bachelor of Arts degree in German and social psychology, and the Playwright's Studio at the National Institute of Dramatic Art (NIDA). In her early twenties, she left Sydney to escape the "banality" and travelled around Europe, before returning to Australia and settling in Sydney.

Career
Pomeranz joined the Special Broadcasting Service (SBS) in 1980 as writer/producer, and was appointed producer for David Stratton's film presentations. Together with Stratton, she hosted the long-running SBS TV program The Movie Show from 1986 until 2004. She appeared on the Australian Broadcasting Corporation (ABC) version of the program, At the Movies, again with Stratton, beginning in 2004 and concluding on 9 December 2014.

In addition to being a critic, Pomeranz is also an anti-censorship campaigner. She was a prominent attendee and was briefly detained by police at an attempted 2003 protest screening of the controversial film Ken Park, banned in Australia. She has been critical of the Australian Office of Film and Literature Classification (now the Australian Classification Board), the Australian censorship body, on a number of occasions. She has also spoken out against production companies refusing to give preview screenings for critics.

On 29 January 2015, it was announced that Pomeranz had signed with Foxtel to present film and television programs on Foxtel Arts, along with Graeme Blundell, in a new series called Screen. The series was renewed in 2018.

,  Pomeranz continues to appear in Screen, and past episodes are uploaded to YouTube.

Recognition
Pomeranz was made a Member of the Order of Australia in the 2005 Australia Day Honours.

In 2017, Pomeranz became the first woman to be honoured with a star on Winton's Walk of Fame during The Vision Splendid Outback Film Festival in Winton, Queensland.

Cameos
Pomeranz had an uncredited role in the 1994 film The Adventures of Priscilla, Queen of the Desert as Adam's mother.

She has also appeared as herself in several Australian comedy programs and promotions, including:
Lawrence Leung's Choose Your Own Adventure (2009), where she and David Stratton review Lawrence Leung's attempt to set a world record for solving the Rubik's Cube whilst sky diving, as they sit on the landing site in their trademark armchairs. 
A 2010 video promoting the new Triple J breakfast team of Tom Ballard and Alex Dyson, where she joined the two men to "satisfy the female demographic". 
 A 2000 episode of Australian comedy show Pizza, a show known for celebrity cameos. 
 Australian sketch comedy show Full Frontal in a 1995 episode.
 1993 Australian comedy film Hercules Returns.

See also
Censorship in Australia
2004 in Australian television
List of Old Girls of PLC Sydney
List of Macquarie University people

References

Further reading
 At the Movies biography, 2004

External links
 

Australian Presbyterians
Australian media personalities
Australian film critics
Australian women film critics
Members of the Order of Australia
People from Sydney
Macquarie University alumni
Living people
1944 births
People educated at the Presbyterian Ladies' College, Sydney